Luke Damon Goss (born 29 September 1968) is an English actor, and drummer of the 1980s band Bros. He has appeared in numerous films including Blade II (2002) as Jared Nomak, One Night with the King (2006) as King Xerxes, Hellboy II: The Golden Army (2008) as Prince Nuada, Tekken (2009) as Steve Fox, Interview with a Hitman (2012) as Viktor, and Traffik (2018) as Red.

Career

Goss, along with twin brother Matt Goss, started his career with the 1980s boy band Bros. In total he has charted with thirteen hit singles in the UK.

When Bros broke up in the early 1990s, Goss worked with the Band of Thieves where he released two singles "Sweeter Than The Midnight Rain" and "Give Me One More Chance", he then released "L.I.F.E." under the band's name change Thieves Like Us due to a change in lineup. His autobiography "I Owe You Nothing" was a top 10 best seller and went on to have three subsequent printings. He also began to appear in stage musicals including Grease and What a Feeling, and has turned to acting in films full-time, with his first most notable role being the villain in Blade II. He also appeared as The Creature in the Hallmark Channel's Frankenstein. Goss can be seen in the 2004 crime drama, Charlie in which he plays real-life gangster Charlie Richardson. In the 2005 comedy The Man, he starred as another villain, Joey/Kane, alongside Eugene Levy and Samuel L. Jackson.

He has since had roles in One Night with the King, as King Xerxes. He appeared in Bone Dry, as Eddie and in the thriller Unearthed, as Kale.  Goss received a CAMIE (Character and Morality in Entertainment) Award for his work in One Night with the King on 12 May 2007 at the Beverly Hills Hotel in Los Angeles. Both One Night with the King and Bone Dry were viewed at the 2007 Cannes Film Festival. Bone Dry premiered in Los Angeles on 9 January 2008.

In the autumn of 2008, Goss returned from filming Hellboy II: The Golden Army in Budapest, Hungary, in which he plays Prince Nuada. The sequel was released in North America on 11 July 2008.

In February 2008 he signed to play the role of Steve Fox in Tekken, which was filmed in Shreveport, Louisiana. He was seen in a commercial for the new Cadillac Escalade Hybrid. In January 2010, Goss won the role as Frankenstein in Death Race 2 which was originally played by Jason Statham in the first film, under the direction from Roel Reiné, which began shooting on location in Eastern Europe in February 2010. Goss also played the lead role in Syfy's dark tale television film Witchville. In May 2010, he won the Ultimate Badass Award at the PollyGrind Film Festival for his role in the zombie-vampire film The Dead Undead. In February 2018, Goss released his directorial debut Your Move.

Personal life

Goss was born in Lewisham, London, the son of Alan Goss and his wife Carol (nee Read).

Filmography

References

External links 
Luke Goss Official Website

Telegraph.co.uk Interview with Luke Goss

1968 births
British identical twins
Bros (British band) members
English male film actors
People from Lewisham
English male television actors
English male singers
English pop singers
English drummers
Living people
Male actors from London
English twins
English expatriates in the United States
20th-century English musicians
21st-century English male actors
21st-century English musicians
20th-century British male musicians
21st-century British male musicians